Raphael Swann is a film producer based in Los Angeles. He is a graduate of the University of Southern California School of Cinematic Arts. Swann co-produced the short film Fishing Without Nets, which won the Jury Prize in Short Filmmaking at the 2012 Sundance Film Festival.

References

American film producers
Living people
Year of birth missing (living people)
USC School of Cinematic Arts alumni